The Men's FIH Series Finals 2019 was the final stage of the 2018–19 edition of the Hockey Series. It was held from April to June 2019.

The International Hockey Federation (FIH) confirmed that Malaysia, India and France would host FIH Series Finals in 2019. The top two teams from each event qualified for the 2019 Men's FIH Olympic Qualifiers.

Qualification
The following 24 teams, shown with pre-tournament World Rankings as of December 2018, when the pools were composed, qualified for the FIH Series Finals.

Kuala Lumpur

All times are local (UTC+8).

First round

Pool A

Pool B

Second round

Cross-overs

Seventh and eighth place

Fifth and sixth place

Semi-finals

Third and fourth place

Final

Final standings

 Qualified for the FIH Olympic Qualifiers

Awards
The following awards were given at the conclusion of the tournament.

Bhubaneswar

All times are local (UTC+5:30).

First round

Pool A

Pool B

Second round

Seventh and eighth place

Cross-overs

Fifth and sixth place

Semi-finals

Third and fourth place

Final

Final standings

 Qualified for the FIH Olympic Qualifiers

Awards
The following awards were given at the conclusion of the tournament.

Le Touquet

All times are local (UTC+2).

First round

Pool A

Pool B

Second round

Cross-overs

Seventh and eighth place

Fifth and sixth place

Semi-finals

Third and fourth place

Final

Final standings

 Qualified for the FIH Olympic Qualifiers

Awards
The following awards were given at the conclusion of the tournament.

Notes

References

External links
Official website

Finals
International field hockey competitions hosted by France
International field hockey competitions hosted by India
International field hockey competitions hosted by Malaysia
Hockey Series Finals
Hockey Series Finals
Hockey Series Finals